Trópico (Spanish and Portuguese for ‘tropic’) or Tropico may refer to:

Computing
Tropico (video game), a 2001 construction simulation game
Tropicos, an online botanical database

Film and television
Tropico (film), a 2013 American short film written by and starring Lana Del Rey
Trópico (TV series), a 2007 Venezuelan-Dominican telenovela

Music
Davide Petrella, Italian singer-songwriter also known as Tropico
Tropico (Pat Benatar album), 1984
Trópico (Ricardo Arjona album), 2009
Tropico, an album by Gato Barbieri, 1978
Tropico, an album by Tony Esposito, 1996

Places 
 Trópico (Bolivia), a subdivision of Cochabamba, Bolivia